Green Team is a brand communications and creative agency.

Green Team may also refer to:

 Green Team (comics), a fictional comic book team
 Green Team Advisory Committee of Fair Lawn, New Jersey, U.S.
 Green Team, University of Florida's TailGator team for game day recycling
 Green Team, the training wing of United States Navy's SEAL Team Six
 Sustainable Green Team, an American forestry company

See also

 Team Green, now Andretti Autosport